Mechlin's Corner Tavern, also known as Peter Mechling's Corner Tavern, is a historic building located at the intersection of County Route 625 (Mechlin Corner Road) and County Route 579 (Bloomsbury Road) in the Mechlings Corner, New Jersey section of Union Township, Hunterdon County, New Jersey and near Pittstown. It was added to the National Register of Historic Places on November 1, 1974, for its significance in architecture and commerce.

History
There was a tavern at this site, then owned by Jonathan Robeson, in 1752 or earlier. The nearby Van Syckel's Tavern dates to 1763. The current building was likely built  by Peter Mechling. He retired in 1844 and sold the tavern to his son William Mechling. In 1890, William deeded it to his son Hiram Mechling. Hiram's death in 1934 ended tavern operation. It is now a private home.

Description
The tavern is an example of Greek Revival architecture. The main part of the tavern is a two and one-half story frame building with a gable roof. It has a one and one-half story extension. The porch has four large square columns.

See also
 National Register of Historic Places listings in Hunterdon County, New Jersey
 Perryville Tavern

References

External links
 

Union Township, Hunterdon County, New Jersey
Buildings and structures in Hunterdon County, New Jersey
National Register of Historic Places in Hunterdon County, New Jersey
Drinking establishments on the National Register of Historic Places in New Jersey
New Jersey Register of Historic Places
Greek Revival architecture in New Jersey
Taverns in New Jersey
1830 establishments in New Jersey
Hotel buildings completed in 1830